The Inflated Tear is a studio album by Roland Kirk, released on Atlantic in 1968. It was re-released in 1998 by Rhino featuring a bonus track and extensive liner notes. In 2017, Pitchfork placed it at number 170 on its list of the "200 Best Albums of the 1960s".

Track listing

Personnel
 Roland Kirk – tenor saxophone, manzello, stritch, clarinet, flute, whistle, cor anglais, flexatone
 Rahn Burton – piano
 Steve Novosel – bass
 Jimmy Hopps – drums
 Dick Griffin (incorrectly credited on the LP sleeve as Dick Griffith) – trombone (on "Fly by Night")

Charts

References

External links
 

1968 albums
Rahsaan Roland Kirk albums
Atlantic Records albums
Albums produced by Joel Dorn